Robert L. Dawson (1943-2007) was a professor of French language and literature in the Department of French and Italian at the University of Texas at Austin.

Biography

Early life
Robert L. Dawson was born on July 26, 1943, in Rio de Janeiro, Brazil.

Career
In 1975, he started teaching French at the University of Texas at Austin.

His fields of interest were eighteenth-century French literature and culture, the history of the book, and descriptive bibliography. His collection of 18th century manuscripts and printed works is held in Texas by the Texas A&M University's Cushing Library.

Death
He died on June 5, 2007, in Paris, France.

References

1943 births
2007 deaths
People from Rio de Janeiro (city)
People from Austin, Texas
University of Texas at Austin faculty